Galeria Akumulatory 2 in Poznań was a Polish gallery exhibiting international art trends such as conceptual art or Fluxus from 1972 to 1990. It hosted numerous solo exhibitions by international conceptual artists and the Fluxus Festival in 1977. The gallery was founded and run by Jarosław Kozłowski, one of the representatives of Polish conceptual art.

Among others, artists exhibited in the Galeria Akumulatory 2 from 1972 - 1990 include:

Eric Andersen
Andrzej Bereziański
John Blake
Rene Block
Victor Burgin
Carlfriedrich Claus
Michael Craig-Martin
COUM Transmissions
Ebon Fisher
Adam Garnek
Geoffrey Hendricks
John Hilliard
Akira Komoto
Hans-Werner Kalkmann
Robin Klassnik
Richard Long
Yoko Ono
Bogdan Perzynski
Endre Tot
Jacek Tylicki
Emmett Williams
Krzysztof Wodiczko

References

External links 
 "Conceptual Art in Poland. Spaces of Discourse"

Art museums and galleries in Poland
Buildings and structures in Poznań
Art galleries established in 1972
Art galleries disestablished in 1989
1972 establishments in Poland
1989 disestablishments in Poland
Defunct museums in Poland